Attica is an unincorporated community in Marion County, Iowa, United States. A notable landmark around the area is the Hammond Covered Bridge Located south of town off of Highway G-76 on 170th.

References

Unincorporated communities in Marion County, Iowa
Unincorporated communities in Iowa